In enzymology, a dihydroxyphenylalanine transaminase is an enzyme that catalyzes the chemical reaction

3,4-dihydroxy-L-phenylalanine + 2-oxoglutarate  3,4-dihydroxyphenylpyruvate + L-glutamate

Thus, the two substrates of this enzyme are 3,4-dihydroxy-L-phenylalanine and 2-oxoglutarate, whereas its two products are 3,4-dihydroxyphenylpyruvate and L-glutamate.

This enzyme belongs to the family of transferases, specifically the transaminases, which transfer nitrogenous groups.  The systematic name of this enzyme class is 3,4-dihydroxy-L-phenylalanine:2-oxoglutarate aminotransferase. Other names in common use include dopa transaminase, dihydroxyphenylalanine aminotransferase, aspartate-DOPP transaminase (ADT), L-dopa transaminase, dopa aminotransferase, glutamate-DOPP transaminase (GDT), phenylalanine-DOPP transaminase (PDT), DOPA 2-oxoglutarate aminotransferase, and DOPAATS.  This enzyme participates in tyrosine metabolism.  It employs one cofactor, pyridoxal phosphate.

References

 

EC 2.6.1
Pyridoxal phosphate enzymes
Enzymes of unknown structure